Sten Samuelson (born 30 April 1926 in Ängelholm, Skåne County, Sweden - died 4 July 2002 in Montreux, Switzerland) was a Swedish architect.

Biography
Samuelson studied architecture at  KTH Royal Institute of Technology in Stockholm.
He was professor at Lund University of Technology from 1964–1983. Together with architect Fritz Jaenecke (1903-1978), Sten Samuelson started a joint office in 1950.  Samuelson worked with Jaenecke & Samuelson until 1970. Together they came to draw several well-known public buildings in the 1950s and 1960s. Jaenecke & Samuelson designed the Malmö Stadion  in Malmö and Ullevi, the multi-purpose stadium in Gothenburg, which were constructed for the 1958 FIFA World Cup.

 

Later designed included the Novotel Warszawa Centrum in Warsaw from  1974 and Malmö Concert Hall from 1985.

References

1926 births
2002 deaths
People from Skåne County
KTH Royal Institute of Technology alumni
Academic staff of Lund University
Swedish architects